To pray is to engage in prayer, an active effort to communicate with a higher being, deity, or spirit.

Pray may also refer to:

Places

France
 Pray, Loir-et-Cher

Italy
 Pray, Piedmont, a comune in the Province of Biella

United States
 Pray, Montana, a census-designated place and unincorporated community in Park County, Montana, United States
 Pray, Wisconsin, an unincorporated community

Pray as a surname
 Carl Pray, American college baseball coach
 György Pray (1723–1801), a Hungarian Jesuit abbot, canon, librarian and historian
 P. Rutilius R. Pray (died 1839), justice of the Supreme Court of Mississippi
 Phyllis Pray Bober (1920–2002), American art historian and professor

Music

Albums
 Pray (Deen album), 2002
 Pray (Rebecca St. James album) or the title song, 1998
 Pray, by Andraé Crouch, 1997
 Pray, by Crematory, 2008

Songs
 "Pray" (DJ BoBo song), 1996
 "Pray" (Justin Bieber song), 2010
 "Pray" (Lasgo song), 2002
 "Pray" (MC Hammer song), 1990
 "Pray" (Sam Smith song), 2017
 "Pray" (Sanctus Real song), 2013
 "Pray" (Take That song), 1993
 "Pray" (Tina Cousins song), 1998
 "Pray" (Tomoko Kawase song), 2006
 "Pray", by Babylon, 2015
 "Pray", by Bebe Rexha from I Don't Wanna Grow Up, 2015
 "Pray", by Flobots from Noenemies, 2017
 "Pray", by Got7 from Call My Name, 2019
 "Pray", by Illenium from Ascend, 2019
 "Pray", by Jay-Z from American Gangster, 2007
 "Pray", by JRY from Fifty Shades Darker: Original Motion Picture Soundtrack, 2017
 "Pray", by Mumzy Stranger, 2015
 "Pray", by Nana Mizuki, a B-side of the single "Massive Wonders", 2007
 "Pray", by Royce da 5'9" from Layers, 2016
 "Pray", by Smokepurpp and Murda Beatz from Bless Yo Trap, 2018
 "Pray", by Vanilla Ninja from Love Is War, 2006

Other uses
 Pray (film), a film produced by Satoshi Fukushima
 Pray, a name for several languages related to the Phai language of Thailand and Laos
Pray people, an ethnic group in Thailand
Pray Codex

See also
Prayer
Praying (disambiguation)
Prays, a genus of moths
Prey (disambiguation)

Distinguish from
Prey